The  ("Ethnobotanical gardens of La Gardie") are botanical gardens located near the Museum of Prehistorama, in the hamlet of Pont d'Avène, Rousson, Gard, Languedoc-Roussillon, France. They are open daily except Monday in July and August, and weekend afternoons in May, June, and September; an admission fee is charged. 

The gardens are organized as a series of woodland clearings that illustrate the rural ethnobotany of the Basses Cévennes region, representing typical woodland management, family farming, and shepherding. Their principal features are orchards and cereals of the past; botanical, medieval, and herb gardens; beehives; dry stone walls; and a charcoal kiln. The gardens contain a range of local heirloom plants including more than 60 varieties of vines; 23 types of olive trees; fruits and berries including arbutus, elderberry, jujube, loquat, and mulberry; and vegetables from the Middle Ages including cabbage, chicory, leeks, lettuce, onions, spinach, turnips, and white beans.

See also 
 List of botanical gardens in France

References 
 Website of the Jardins ethnobotaniques
 "Hidden gardens of southern France", Louisa Jones, The Telegraph, 28 Jul 2008.
 Parcs et Jardins entry (French)
 1001 Fleurs entry (French)
 Jardinez entry (French)
 Pays Cevennes entry (French)

Gardie, Jardins ethnobotaniques de la
Gardie, Jardins ethnobotaniques de la